Acton Bridge (formerly Acton) is a village and civil parish in Cheshire, England. Located within the unitary authority of Cheshire West and Chester on the River Weaver, it is near the Trent and Mersey Canal at approximately 53˚ 16′ N, 2˚ 36′ W. It has a population of 602, increasing to 631 at the 2011 Census.
Acton Bridge is served by its own railway station, operated by London Northwestern.

Acton Bridge Parish Council meets in the Parish Rooms. There is an active Community Association, and a number of other organisations exist within the village.

History

This section is adapted (with permission) from Snapshots in Time, a book about the village published by the Acton Bridge WI to mark the Millennium in 2000.

Acton Bridge is a small village of 265 households and about 600 inhabitants, situated four miles west of Northwich in Cheshire, on the south bank of the River Weaver. It is on the West Coast Main Line railway. The A49 trunk road crosses the River Weaver by the Acton swing bridge to the northern boundary of the village. Once famous for its pear orchards and dairy farms, it is now a pleasant dormitory village with easy access to the motorway network.

The earliest evidence of human presence in the area is by the discovery of a Langdale axe dating from the Iron Age. It was found near Acton Brook, about 70 metres from Acton Bridge station and 300 metres from Onston. Archaeological remains of an ancient fortification have also been found in that area, on the bluff above Acton Brook.

The village was called Acton in Delamere until recent times, when it was a changed to Acton Bridge to avoid confusion with Acton near Nantwich. The old spelling is Actune; Ac (Saxon) meaning "oak", and tune or tun meaning "farm or place" – so the name meant "Oak Farm" or "a place in the oak forest". In George Ormerod's History of Cheshire, Acton in Delamere is mentioned with Milton as being part of "Wiverham fee" or parish at the time of Domesday Book (1086).

In the Middle Ages, Weaverham included six entire townships, Weaverham, Acton, Crowton, Cuddington, Onston and Wallescote and also parts of Norley and Hartford. This parish was in the Eddisbury Hundred. The poetic description by Ormerod is: "The scenery of this district consists principally of fine meadow ground sloping to the banks of the Weever and not destitute of pleasing undulations of surface or fine timber which here receiving protection from the sea breezes begins to attain its wonted luzuriancy". Ormerod also tells us that "deer ranged from the forest to the bank of the Weever through these townships".

At different times the Lords of Hellesby, the Abbots of Vale Royal, the Actons, the Duttons, the Gerrards and the Fleetwoods held Acton. In 1253 the tenure of Acton is recorded in the Red Book of the Exchequer as having the Lords of Hellesby as paramount Lords. In the reign of Edward I, Alan de Acton did homage at Vale Royal for the lands at Acton. Also around this time William de Acton and Hugh de Acton "entered into recognizances with Richard de Mascy and other Lords of Legh or Leigh near Acton, to settle boundaries of the townships of Legh and Acton by perambulation".

In Edward II's reign a suit was brought by the widow of Walter de Acton against Robert de Mullington and John fitz Gilbert and other for disseizing her of her lands in Acton. John fitz Gilbert pleaded that the tenements consisted of wood and moor. In the year 1284 the Abbot of Vale Royal complained that Sir Hugh Dutton rendered his fisheries in the Weaver useless by erecting a mill and digging a pool. In 1308 Sir Peter Dutton offended having raised a fishery in the Weaver to the King's damage (Vale Royal Ledger Book). In 1356 Adam de Acton fought at the Battle of Poitiers with the Black Prince, and in 1408 John de Acton was appointed Governor and Admiral of the Fleet.

In the reign of Henry VIII Sir Peter Dutton held the Manor of Acton from the King as of his manor of Weaverham by military service. At this time Omerod writes that the tithes of geese, pigs, hemp and flax in Acton are paid to the Lord of Dutton.

During the Civil War in 1644 Sir Thomas Aston exercised "all manor of outrages and intollerable taxes. They plundered Weaverham and the country about, carried off old men out of their houses, bound them together, tyde them to a cart and rove them through mire and water to that dungeon, where they lie without fire or light and now through extremities are so diseased, they are ready to give up the ghost".

The ancient inheritance of the Duttons was passed by marriage to the Gerrards and the Fleetwoods. It was sold to a Mr Scarfe or Scrasse from whom it was purchased by Richard Ashton Esq. In 1640 the land was sold, and became part of the Milner estate until 1918, when these properties were sold to individual householders.

See also

Listed buildings in Acton Bridge

References

External links

 The Weaver Refining Co Ltd at Acton Bridge – John P. Birchall

Villages in Cheshire
Civil parishes in Cheshire